Jérôme Golmard was the defending champion but lost in the second round to Adrian Voinea. 

Michal Tabara won in the final 6–2, 7–6(7–4) against Andrei Stoliarov.

Seeds

Draw

Finals

Top half

Bottom half

Qualifying

Seeds

Qualifiers

Draw

First qualifier

Second qualifier

Third qualifier

Fourth qualifier

External links
 2001 Gold Flake Open draw
 2001 Gold Flake Open Singles Qualifying draw

2001 Gold Flake Open
Gold Flake Open
Maharashtra Open